Anthidium illustre is a species of bee in the family Megachilidae, the leaf-cutter, carder, or mason bees.

Distribution
Middle America and North America

Synonyms
Synonyms for this species include:
Anthidium serranum Cockerell, 1904
Callanthidium illustre (Cresson, 1879)

References

External links
Images
Anatomical illustrations and photos

illustre
Insects described in 1879
Taxa named by Ezra Townsend Cresson